Ozyorsk or Ozersk is a closed city in Chelyabinsk Oblast, Russia. It has a population of 82,164 as of the 2010 census.

History
The town was founded on the shores of Lake Irtyash in 1947. Until 1994, it was known as Chelyabinsk-65, and even earlier, as Chelyabinsk-40 (the digits are the last digits of the postal code, and the name is that of the nearest big city, which was a common practice of giving names to closed towns).

Codenamed City 40, Ozersk was the birthplace of the Soviet nuclear weapons program after the Second World War.
In 1994, it was granted town status and renamed Ozyorsk.

Administrative and municipal status
Within the framework of administrative divisions, it is, together with six rural localities, incorporated as the Town of Ozyorsk—an administrative unit with the status equal to that of the districts. As a municipal division, the Town of Ozyorsk is incorporated as Ozyorsky Urban Okrug.

Economy
Ozyorsk was and remains a closed town because of its proximity to the Mayak plant, one of the sources of Soviet plutonium during the Cold War, and now a Russian facility for processing nuclear waste and recycling nuclear material from decommissioned nuclear weapons.

The plant itself covers an area of approximately 90 km2 and employs about 15,000 people.

The Mayak is primarily engaged in reprocessing of spent nuclear fuel from the nuclear submarines and icebreakers and from nuclear power plants.  Commercially, it produces cobalt-60, iridium-192, and carbon-14.

The town's coat of arms depicts a flame-colored salamander.

Southern-Urals Construction Department is another major enterprise. Its activities include construction for atomic industry needs, production of concrete constructions and construction materials.

Main products of Plant of Wiring Products #2 are low-voltage devices for military-industrial establishments.

Radioactive contamination and the 1957 disaster

Ozyorsk along with Richland, Washington, were the first two cities in the world to produce plutonium for use in cold war atomic bombs.

The Chelyabinsk region has been reported as being one of the most polluted places on Earth, having previously been a center of production of weapons-grade plutonium.

Ozyorsk and the surrounding countryside have been heavily contaminated by industrial pollution from the Mayak plutonium plant since the late 1940s. The Mayak plant was one of the largest producers of weapons-grade plutonium for the Soviet Union during much of the Cold War, particularly during the Soviet atomic bomb program. Built and operated with great haste and disregard for safety, largely out of gaps in information, between 1945 and 1957 the plant dumped and released large amounts of solid, liquid and gaseous radioactive material into the area immediately around the plant. Over time, the sum of radionuclide contamination is estimated to be 2-3 times the release from the explosions from the Chernobyl accident.

Kyshtym disaster 

In 1957, the Mayak plant was the site of a major disaster, releasing more radioactive contamination than the meltdown at Chernobyl. An improperly stored underground tank of high-level liquid nuclear waste exploded, contaminating thousands of square kilometres of territory, now known as the Eastern Ural Radioactive Trace (EURT). The matter was quietly and secretly covered up, and few either inside or outside Russia were aware of the full scope of the disaster until 1980.

Before the 1957 accident, much of the waste was dumped into the Techa River, which it severely contaminated as well as residents of dozens of riverside villages such as Muslyumovo, who relied on the river as their sole source of drinking, washing and bathing water.  After the 1957 accident, dumping in the Techa River officially ceased, but the waste material was dumped in convenient shallow lakes near the plant instead, of which 7 have been officially identified. Of particular concern is Lake Karachay, the closest lake to the plant (now notorious as the most contaminated place on Earth) where roughly 4.4 exabecquerels of high-level liquid waste (75-90% of the total radioactivity released by Chernobyl) was dumped and concentrated in the shallow  lake over several decades.

In addition to the radioactive risks, the airborne lead and particulate soot levels in Ozyorsk (along with much of the Ural industrial region) are also very high—roughly equal to the levels encountered along busy roadsides in the era predating unleaded gasoline and catalytic converters—due to the presence of numerous lead smelters.

On Sunday September 29, 1957 at 4:22 pm, in the production association "Beacon" in Ozersk one of the containers exploded, in which high-level waste was kept. The explosion completely destroyed a stainless steel container located in a concrete canyon 8.2 meters deep. In total, there were 14 containers ("cans") in the canyon. One tenth of the radioactive substances were lifted into the air. After the explosion, a column of smoke and dust rose up to a kilometer high, the dust flickered with an orange-red light and settled on buildings and people. The rest of the waste discarded from the tank remained at the industrial site. Reactor plants got into the contamination zone.

Immediately after the explosion at the facilities of the chemical plant, dosimetrists noted a sharp increase in the background radiation. Many industrial buildings, vehicles, concrete and railways were contaminated. The main spot of radioactive contamination fell on the territory of industrial sites, and 256 cubic meters of radioactive solutions were poured into the tank. The radioactive cloud passed the city of atomic scientists and passed by due to the successful location of the city - when it was laid, the wind rose was taken into account.

As a result of the explosion of the container, a concrete slab weighing 160 tons was torn off. A brick wall was destroyed in a building located 200 meters from the explosion site. They did not immediately notice the polluted streets, canteens, shops, schools, and kindergartens. In the first hours after the explosion, radioactive substances were brought into the city on the wheels of cars and buses, on the clothes and shoes of industrial workers. The most polluted was the central Lenin street, especially when entering the city from the industrial site, and Shkolnaya street, where the management of the plant lived. Subsequently, the flow of radioactive substances was suspended. It was forbidden to enter the city from industrial sites for cars and buses. Site workers at the checkpoint got off the buses and passed the checkpoint. This requirement extended to everyone, regardless of rank and official position. Shoes were washed on flowing trays.

The territory, which was exposed to radioactive contamination as a result of the explosion at the chemical plant, was named "East Ural Radioactive Trace" (EURT). Its total length was about 300 km, with a width of 5–10 km. This area was inhabited by about 270 thousand people. Fields, pastures, reservoirs, forests were polluted on the territory, which turned out to be unsuitable for further use.

In a memo addressed to the Central Committee of the CPSU, Industry Minister E.P. Slavsky wrote: "Investigating the causes of the accident on the spot, the commission believes that the main culprits of this incident are the head of the radiochemical plant and the chief engineer of this plant, who committed a gross violation of the technological regulations for the operation of storage of radioactive solutions". In the order for the Ministry of Medium Machine Building, signed by E.P. Slavsky, it was noted that the reason for the explosion was insufficient cooling of the container, which led to an increase in the temperature in it and to the creation of conditions for the explosion of salts. This was later confirmed in experiments carried out by the Central Factory Laboratory (CPL). The director of the plant M. A. Demyanovich took all the blame for the accident, for which he was relieved of his duties as director.

The radiation accident in the Urals posed a whole series of completely new tasks for science and practice. It was necessary to develop measures for the radiation protection of the population. An Experimental Station was created in the Urals, which played a leading role in studying the consequences of the accident and developing the necessary recommendations.

Radioactive contamination of the local population 
While the environmental impact of the disaster was immense, the contamination of the local populace was equally devastating. The average person living in Ozyorsk, 8 km from the Mayak Nuclear Facility, had a long term radioactive burden on their body at 17 Bq. Because of the large amounts of radioactive materials that were discharged into the atmosphere, over 22 small towns throughout the region were evacuated. Some cities took two years for a full evacuation to take place.

Reports indicated that humans living in the affected area during the time that the disaster took place and their offspring have developed problems with reproductive functions, mortality, age structure, and sex deformities. These populations were recorded at experiencing a radioactive exposure of 40-500 mSv.

Education and culture
There are seventeen different cultural and public-service institutions.

There are sixteen secondary schools, two schools specializing in the English language, one gymnasium, physics-mathematics lyceum, three professional colleges, Southern-Ural  Polytechnical College, Music College, Ozyorsk Engineering Institute (an affiliate of National Research Nuclear University MEPhI), and affiliates of Yekaterinburg's and Chelyabinsk's universities.

In popular culture 
City 40 is a documentary film about the town, by Samira Goetschel, released in July 2016.

References

Notes

Sources

Further reading
 Kate Brown, Plutopia: Nuclear Families, Atomic Cities, and the Great Soviet and American Plutonium Disasters. Oxford: Oxford University Press, 2013.

External links
 Official website of Ozyorsky Urban Okrug
 News, views and people (information portal of Ozyorsk)
 Information portal of Ozyorsk
 News portal of Ozyorsk
 Website of Ozyorsk
Article about Ozyorsk and Mayak at uralpress.ru
Plutopia: Nuclear Families, Atomic Cities, and the Great Soviet and American Plutonium Disasters

Cities and towns in Chelyabinsk Oblast
Closed cities